William H. Swanson (born 1949) is an American businessman, engineer and car collector who is the former chairman and CEO of Raytheon Company (2004 -2014).

Education

A native of California, Swanson graduated magna cum laude from California Polytechnic State University, San Luis Obispo with a bachelor's degree in industrial engineering. He attended Cal Poly with the assistance of a golf scholarship.  He was awarded an honorary Doctorate from Pepperdine University and served on the Board of Regents of Pepperdine.  He was selected as the Outstanding Industrial Engineering Graduate in 1972, and in 1991 was recognized as an Honored Alumnus by California Polytechnic State University College of Engineering. He attended a graduate degree program in business administration at Golden Gate University.

Career

Raytheon 
Swanson joined Raytheon in 1972 and held a wide range of leadership positions, including manufacturing manager of the company’s Equipment Division, general manager of the Missile Systems Division's Andover Plant, senior vice president and general manager of the Missile Systems Division, general manager of Raytheon Electronic Systems, and president, chairman and chief executive officer of Raytheon Systems Company.

Before becoming chairman of Raytheon in January 2004, Swanson was CEO and president of the company. Prior to that he was president of the company, responsible for Raytheon’s government and defense operations, including the four Strategic Business Areas of Missile Defense; Precision Engagement; Intelligence, Surveillance and Reconnaissance (ISR); and Homeland Security. Before that, he was a Raytheon executive vice president and president of Electronic Systems.

As a protégé of Chairman and CEO Dennis Picard and a long-time Raytheon insider, he was the expected candidate to succeed the retiring chairman in the late 1990s.  However, Daniel Burnham, an outsider, was elected to succeed Dennis Picard as Chairman and CEO. After Burnham completed a five-year contract with Raytheon, Swanson was elevated to his position.

Swanson stepped down from the CEO position in March 2014 and retired from Raytheon entirely in September 2014.  He was succeeded by Dr. Thomas A. Kennedy, who had previously served as Raytheon's Chief Operating Officer.

Car Collection 
Swanson is the owner and curator of an entirely-red collection of exotic vehicles based in Arroyo Grande, California. The collection, which primarily houses Ferraris, includes cars from the 1960s to the modern day. The license plate on every car contains his initials “WHS" alongside a different number or letter(s). 
The collection currently includes:

 Ferrari 250 GT Pininfarina Cabriolet Series I
 Ferrari 250 GT LWB Berlinetta
 Ferrari 275 GTB/4
 Ferrari F40
 Ferrari F50
 Ferrari Enzo
 Ferrari LaFerrari
 Ferrari F12 TDF
 Ferrari SA Aperta
 Ferrari 812 Superfast
 Porsche Carrera GT
 Porsche 918 Spyder
 Bugatti Veyron 16.4
 Cobra 289
 Cobra 427
 BMW 507
 Ford GT (2005)
 Ford GT (2017)

Honors and associations
 Member of the board of directors of Sprint Nextel Corporation.
 Member of the Congressional Medal of Honor Foundation board of directors, the California Polytechnic State University President’s Cabinet, and the Rose Kennedy Greenway board.
 Appointed to the Pepperdine University board of regents and awarded an honorary doctor of laws degree and the Woodrow Wilson Award for Corporate Citizenship.
 Member of the Secretary of the Air Force advisory board.
 Trustee of the Association of the United States Army.
 Member of the National Defense Industrial Association.
 Member of the Navy League.
 Member of the Air Force Association.
 Member of the Board of Governors of the Aerospace Industries Association.
 Member of the CIA Officers Memorial Foundation board of advisors.
 Associate fellow of the American Institute of Aeronautics and Astronautics.
 Member of the US president’s National Security Telecommunications Advisory Committee.
 Vice chairman of the Business-Higher Education Forum (BHEF).
 Co-chair of BHEF's Securing America's Leadership in Science, Technology, Engineering and Mathematics (STEM) Initiative.
 Honorary chair of MATHCOUNTS for 2009 through 2011.
 Honorary chair of 2011 Engineers Week.

Swanson's Unwritten Rules of Management and plagiarism

Swanson released a short work called Swanson's Unwritten Rules of Management, thirty three sound-bite rules, including the comparatively well known "Waiter Rule".

On April 24, 2006, in a statement  released by Raytheon, Swanson admitted to plagiarism in claiming authorship for his booklet, "Swanson's Unwritten Rules of Management," after being exposed by an article in The New York Times. On May 2, 2006, Raytheon withdrew distribution of the book.  On May 3, 2006, Raytheon punished Swanson by reducing his compensation by approximately $1 million for publishing what was "later found to have been taken from a 1944 engineering classic, The Unwritten Laws of Engineering, by W. J. King."  Further investigation by the Boston Herald revealed that Swanson had also copied some of the rules from former US Secretary of Defense Donald Rumsfeld and columnist Dave Barry.

The Boston Globe, the major newspaper in Raytheon's home town, reported "the move was largely symbolic given Swanson's robust $7 million pay package in 2005."

References

External links
Raytheon's biography of William H. Swanson (in PDF format).
Past Leadership of Raytheon

American chief executives of manufacturing companies
1949 births
Living people
Raytheon Company people
Golden Gate University alumni